Malsawmtluanga (born 11 January 1989) simply known as Mala, is an Indian professional footballer who plays as a midfielder for Royal Wahingdoh F.C. in the I-League.He currently play with Aizawl FC.

Career
Mala started his career with Royal Wahingdoh and played for them in the Shillong Premier League and I-League 2nd Division. In 2014, he helped the side reach the I-League.

He made his professional debut for the side on 28 December 2014 in the Federation Cup against Mumbai.

Career statistics

References

1989 births
Living people
Footballers from Mizoram

Indian footballers
Royal Wahingdoh FC players
Association football midfielders

I-League 2nd Division players
I-League players